National Taiwan Sport University, sub-station name Guishan Leshan, is a metro station on the Taoyuan Airport MRT located in Guishan District, Taoyuan City, Taiwan. The station opened for commercial service on 2 March 2017. The local placename is Niujiaopo.

Station overview
This underground station has two side platforms. It opened for trial service on 2 February 2017, and for commercial service on 2 March 2017.

History
 2 March 2017: The station opened for commercial service with the opening of the Taipei-Huanbei section of the Airport MRT.

Around the station
 Chang Gung University
 Chang Gung University of Science and Technology
 Formosa Plastics Group Museum
 National Taiwan Sport University

See also
 Taoyuan Metro

References

Railway stations opened in 2017
2017 establishments in Taiwan
Taoyuan Airport MRT stations